The Hotari is a left tributary of the river Soloneț in Romania. It flows into the Soloneț near Humoreni.

References

Rivers of Romania
Rivers of Suceava County